This is a list of films which placed number one at the weekly box office for the year 2002.

Highest-grossing films

References

See also
 List of Mexican films — Mexican films by year
 Lists of box office number-one films

2002
Box
Mexico